Joe Versus the Volcano is a 1990 American romantic comedy film written and directed by John Patrick Shanley and starring Tom Hanks and Meg Ryan. Hanks plays a man who, after being told he is dying of a rare disease, accepts a financial offer to travel to a South Pacific island and throw himself into a volcano on behalf of the superstitious natives. Along the way, he meets and falls in love with the woman taking him there.

The film received mixed reviews overall, but positive reviews from some critics, including Roger Ebert, who described the film as "new and fresh and not shy of taking chances", and was a minor box office success in the US. It has since become a cult film.

Plot
Joe Banks is a downtrodden everyman from Staten Island, working a clerical job in a dreary factory for an unpleasant, demanding boss, Frank Waturi. Joyless, listless and chronically sick, Banks regularly visits doctors who can find nothing wrong with him. Finally, a Dr. Ellison diagnoses an incurable disease called a "brain cloud", which has no symptoms, but will kill him within five or six months. Ellison says that the symptoms he has been experiencing are actually psychosomatic, caused by trauma in his previous job as a firefighter. Ellison advises him, "You have some life left ... live it well." Joe tells his boss off, quits his job, and asks former coworker DeDe out on a date. Their date is a success, but when Joe tells DeDe that he is dying, she tells him she cannot deal with the revelation and leaves.

The next day, a wealthy industrialist named Samuel Graynamore makes Joe an unexpected proposition. Graynamore needs "bubaru", a mineral essential for manufacturing superconductors. There are deposits of it on the tiny Pacific island of Waponi Woo, but the resident Waponis will only let him mine it if he solves a problem for them. They believe that the fire god of the volcano on their island must be appeased by a voluntary human sacrifice once every century, but none of them are willing to volunteer this time around. Graynamore offers to pay for whatever Joe wants to enjoy his final days, as long as he jumps into the volcano within 20 days. With nothing to lose, Joe accepts.

Joe spends a day and a night out on the town in New York City, where he solicits advice on everything from style to living life to the fullest from his chauffeur, Marshall. He also purchases four top-of-the-line, waterproof steamer trunks from a fanatically dedicated luggage salesman.

Joe then flies to Los Angeles, where he is met by one of Graynamore's daughters, Angelica, a flighty socialite. The next morning, Angelica takes Joe to her father's yacht, the Tweedledee. The captain is her half-sister Patricia. Patricia has reluctantly agreed to take Joe to Waponi Woo; Graynamore has promised to give her the yacht in return.

After an awkward beginning, Joe and Patricia begin to bond. Then they run into a typhoon. Patricia is knocked unconscious and flung overboard. After Joe jumps in to rescue her, lightning strikes, sinking the yacht. Joe is able to construct a raft by lashing together his steamer trunks. Patricia does not regain consciousness for several days. Joe doles out the small supply of fresh water to her, while he gradually becomes delirious from thirst. He experiences a revelation during his delirium and thanks God for his life. When Patricia finally awakens, she is deeply touched by Joe's self-sacrifice. They then find that they have luckily drifted to their destination.

The Waponis treat them to a grand feast. Their leader, Chief Tobi, asks one last time if anyone else will volunteer, but there are no takers and Joe heads to the volcano. Patricia tries to stop him, declaring her love for him. He admits he loves her as well, "but the timing stinks." Patricia persuades Joe to have the chief marry them.

Afterwards, Patricia refuses to be separated from her new husband. When Joe is unable to dissuade her, they jump in together, but the volcano erupts at that moment, blowing them out into the ocean. The island sinks, but Joe and Patricia land near Joe's trusty steamer trunks. At first ecstatic about their miraculous salvation, Joe tells Patricia about his fatal brain cloud. She recognizes the name of Joe's doctor as that of her father's crony and realizes that Joe has been set up. He is not dying and they can live happily ever after.

Cast

In addition, two other notable actors in smaller roles are Nathan Lane as Baw, the Waponi advance man, and Carol Kane, inexplicably credited as Lisa LeBlanc, a hairdresser.

Reception
On Rotten Tomatoes, the film holds an approval rating of 64% based on 36 reviews, with an average rating of 6.1/10. The website's critical consensus reads: "Joe Versus the Volcano erupts with plenty of screwball energy and thoughtful observations about living to the fullest, but its existential ambition may prove too goofy for some audiences." At Metacritic, the film has a weighted average score of 45 out of 100, based on 18 critics, indicating "mixed or average reviews". Audiences surveyed by CinemaScore gave the film a grade "C+" on scale of A to F.

Vincent Canby wrote:  Upon its release, Time called it a "wan bit of whimsy ... [that] makes no more sense than its synopsis, though Meg Ryan beguiles in three different roles. Fifteen years later, Time critic Richard Schickel listed it as one of his "Guilty Pleasures"; while acknowledging "there are people who think this film... may be the worst big budget film of modern times," Schickel disagreed: 

Roger Ebert gave it 3.5 out of 4 stars and called it:  He later brought the film to Ebertfest 2012 and wondered "why he gave 3.5 stars instead of 4."

Soundtrack
The soundtrack, composed by Georges Delerue, was not released in 1990, the year of the movie's release. Because of Delerue's strong following, a sub-label of Varèse Sarabande released a CD in 2002 (limited to 3000 copies), and again in 2016 (with a few extra songs, limited to 2000 copies).

Shanley wrote two songs for the film, "Marooned Without You" and "The Cowboy Song", the former used thematically throughout and the latter performed by Hanks on the ukulele.

Eric Burdon's version of Merle Travis's "Sixteen Tons" was used at the beginning of the film. After Joe leaves the doctor's office, an edited version of Ray Charles's version of "Ol' Man River" plays. "Mas que Nada" by Sergio Mendes & Brazil '66 accompanies Joe while he is driven around New York City. A Spanish version of "On The Street Where You Live" is sung while Joe is on his date with DeDe. Elvis Presley's version of "Blue Moon" plays as Joe spends his final night before departing on his journey. On the boat trip, the Young Rascals' version of "Good Lovin'", the Del-Vikings "Come Go with Me", and The Ink Spots' version of "I Cover the Waterfront" are heard. Waponi tribal music includes the melodies "When Johnny Comes Marching Home" and "Hava Nagila".

Home media
The film was first released on home video in late 1990 and was later released on DVD by Warner Home Video in April 2002.

The manufacture-on-demand Blu-ray was released through Warner Archive Collection on June 20, 2017, and it received positive reviews for the quality.

Stage musical
In 2012, San Diego's Lambs Players Theatre presented the world premiere of a musical based on the film. Directed by Robert Smyth, it featured a book, music and lyrics by Scott Hafso and Darcy Phillips, with musical direction by Jon Lorenz and additional musical arrangements by Taylor Peckham.

References

External links

 
 
 

1990 films
1990 romantic comedy films
American fantasy comedy films
American romantic comedy films
Existentialist films
Films scored by Georges Delerue
Films about volcanoes
Films directed by John Patrick Shanley
Films set in Los Angeles
Films set in New York City
Films set in Oceania
Films set on fictional islands
Films adapted into plays
Films with screenplays by John Patrick Shanley
Magic realism films
Amblin Entertainment films
Warner Bros. films
1990 directorial debut films
1990s English-language films
1990s American films